Ralph Cavanagh is a senior attorney and co-director of Natural Resources Defense Council's energy program. Cavanagh has been with the NRDC since 1979 and was on the Secretary of Energy Advisory board from 1993 to 2003. Cavanagh has served as visiting professor at both Stanford University and UC Berkeley.

Cavanagh has won multiple awards, including the 3rd Annual Heinz Award for Public Policy in 1997, the National Association of Regulatory Utility Commissioners’ Mary Kilmarx Award, the Yale Law School's Preiskel-Silverman Fellowship, the NW Energy Coalition's Headwaters Award, and the Bonneville Power Administration's Award for Exceptional Public Service.

Cavanagh graduated from Yale College, where he was a member of the Yale debate team, and the Yale Law School. He was married to Deborah Rhode (1952–2021), MacFarland Professor of Law at Stanford Law School.

Cavanagh has been anti-nuclear energy and was a key architect of the 2016 deal to shut down Diablo Canyon.

See also
Renewable energy
Energy conservation in the United States

References

People associated with energy
Sustainability advocates
Yale Law School alumni
Living people
Year of birth missing (living people)